Darwin Andrade (born 11 February 1991) is a Colombian football player who currently plays for Deportivo Cali.

Honours
Standard Liège
Belgian Cup: 2015–16

References

MLSZ 

1991 births
Living people
People from Quibdó
Colombian footballers
Association football defenders
La Equidad footballers
Sint-Truidense V.V. players
Újpest FC players
Standard Liège players
Deportivo Cali footballers
Categoría Primera A players
Nemzeti Bajnokság I players
Belgian Pro League players
Colombian expatriate footballers
Expatriate footballers in Belgium
Expatriate footballers in Hungary
Colombian expatriate sportspeople in Belgium
Colombian expatriate sportspeople in Hungary
Colombia international footballers
2015 Copa América players
Sportspeople from Chocó Department